Ronaldas Rutkauskas (born 3 March 1992) is a Lithuanian professional basketball player. Born in Kaunas, he started his professional career in Sweden with 08 Stockholm. Rutkauskas received the BBL Best Rebounder Award in 2015 while playing for Pärnu and was the leading scorer of the Belarus Premier League in 2012.

Rutkauskas has represented Lithuania at junior levels.

Professional career
Born in Kaunas in 1992, Rutkauskas started playing basketball at a very young age in the basketball academies of Arvydas Sabonis. His professional started career in 2009 with Swedish team 08 Stockholm, before joining Belarusian team Tsmoki-Minsk in 2011. Rutkauskas while playing for Tsmoki-Minsk II in the Belarus Premier League, led the league in scoring for the 2011–12 season with 19.6 points and had the second-best record with 9.4 rebounds per game in 30 games, also setting the season-high for scoring in a game as he scored 38 points against Rubon Vitebsk. He improved his numbers the next season to 21.5 points and 10.2 rebounds per game, before in January 2013 he agreed terms with Swedish team Stockholm Eagles. Rutkauskas joined Cypriot club ETHA Engomis in September 2013, before moving to Spain to play for LEB Oro team Ourense.

Rutkauskas joined Pärnu for the 2014–15 season, scoring 8 points and grabbing 10 rebounds in his debut against TU/Rock. He was named BBL's Most Valuable Player for December, while he also received the BBL Best Rebounder Award at the end of the season. In October 2015, he signed for Jēkabpils in Latvia. While at Jēkabpils he was named BBL's Most Valuable Player for January 2016, by averaging 15.5 points, 11 rebounds, and 1.3 steals, earning the honor for the second time in his career. In July 2016, Rutkauskas agreed a contract with Greek A2 team Iraklis Thessaloniki. He finished his season with 11.4 points and 7 rebounds per game, appearing in all but one  regular season games.

In July 2021, Rutkauskas signed with reigning Icelandic champions Þór Þorlákshöfn. On 2 October 2021, he had 23 points and 12 rebounds in Þór's 113–100 win against Njarðvík in the Icelandic Super Cup.

Professional career statistics

Baltic Basketball League

Source:

|-
| align="left" | 2014–15
| align="left" | Pärnu
| 9 || 9  || 32.6 || .571 || .200 || .733 || style="background:#cfecec;"|10.4 || 2.1 || 0.9 || 0.3 || 18.7
|-
| align="left" | 2015–16
| align="left" | BK Jēkabpils
| 13 || 13 || 30.7 || .608 || 1.000 || .690 || 9.3 || 1.0 || 1.0 || 0.4 || 13.8
|-
|- class="sortbottom"
| style="text-align:center;" colspan="2"| Career
| align="right" | 22 || 22 || 31.5 || .587 || .273 || .701 || 9.8 || 1.5 || 1.0 || 0.4 || 15.8
|-

International career
Rutkauskas was in the preselection squad of Lithuania under-19 for the 2011 FIBA Under-19 World Championship. He scored 5 points in a friendly game against LKKA Atletas, before being cut off the tournament's final squad. He was also in the preselection of Lithuania under-20 for the 2012 FIBA Europe Under-20 Championship.

References

External links
BBL profile
FIBA profile
REAL GM profile

1992 births
Living people
CEP Lorient players
Iraklis Thessaloniki B.C. players
KK Pärnu players
Koroivos B.C. players
Lithuanian expatriate basketball people in Estonia
Lithuanian expatriate basketball people in Iceland
Lithuanian men's basketball players
Power forwards (basketball)
Úrvalsdeild karla (basketball) players
Þór Þorlákshöfn (basketball club) players